SMEA may stand for:

 Small and Medium Enterprise Administration, a government agency in Taiwan.
 Graduate School of Agri-Food Management and Economics, a graduate school in Cremona, Italy.
 Standard Modern Eastern Armenian
 Sony Music Entertainment Australia